Buchanania lanceolata is a species of plant in the family Anacardiaceae. It is endemic to India.

References

lanceolata
Endemic flora of India (region)
Vulnerable plants
Taxonomy articles created by Polbot